is a Japanese football player. He plays for Thespakusatsu Gunma.

Club statistics
Updated to 20 February 2017.

References

External links

1996 births
Living people
Association football people from Chiba Prefecture
Japanese footballers
J2 League players
Japan Football League players
Thespakusatsu Gunma players
Tochigi City FC players
Association football defenders